Banka, Banca or Bangka may refer to:

Places
 Báng-kah khu, former name of Wanhua District in Taipei, Taiwan
 Banka or Bangka Island, an island between Sumatra and Singapore, see

 Banka, Bihar, a town and municipality in India
 Banka Junction railway station
 Banka district in Bihar, India, with headquarters in Banka town
 Banka (Lok Sabha constituency) in Bihar
 Banka, Uttar Pradesh, a village in Uttar Pradesh, India

 Banka, Cameroon, a town
 Banka, Piešťany District, a village in the Trnava Region of Slovakia

 Bankə, a village and municipality in Azerbaijan also known as Banka

Other
 Sant Banka, Maharashtran saint, and brother in law of Chokhamela

See also 
 Banca (disambiguation)
 Bangka (disambiguation)
 Banga (disambiguation)
 Banke (disambiguation)